Joan Marie O'Brien (born February 14, 1936) is an American actress and singer. She made a name for herself acting in television shows in the 1950s and 1960s and as a film co-star with Cary Grant, Elvis Presley, John Wayne, and Jerry Lewis.

Early life
Joan O'Brien was born to David and Rita O'Brien on Valentine's Day 1936, in Cambridge, Massachusetts. The family moved to California when O'Brien was a child and enrolled her in dance classes when she was eight years old. O'Brien graduated from Chaffey Union High School in Ontario, California.

Career
O'Brien's singing abilities came to the attention of entertainer and Country Music Hall of Fame member Cliffie Stone, who hired her as a regular performer on his television show Hometown Jamboree before her high school graduation. In 1954, she became a regular on The Bob Crosby Show and stayed until shortly before the show's cancellation in 1958. She co-starred with Cary Grant and Tony Curtis in the 1959 film Operation Petticoat.

Lawrence Welk hired O'Brien as a one-week replacement for his champagne lady Alice Lon in July 1959. O'Brien had come to Welk's attention years earlier as  a singer on Bob Crosby's show but, at that time, Welk had decided not to hire her because she was still a teenager.

O’Brien performed in several episodes on the TV western Bat Masterson. The episode S2E01 "To the Manner Born" (1959) had her singing as up-and-coming opera soprano Dora Miller.

O'Brien was cast as survivor Susanna Dickinson in John Wayne's 1960 epic feature film retelling of battle of The Alamo. That same year, O'Brien performed as a soloist for composer Buddy Bregman at the Moulin Rouge night club in Los Angeles. In 1961 O'Brien again co-starred with John Wayne as his love interest in The Comancheros.

Actresses Sheree North, Sabrina, and Sue Carson joined O'Brien in a tour of Playgirls in 1961, appearing at the Riverside Hotel in Reno, Nevada.

O'Brien played Elvis Presley's girlfriend in the 1963 film It Happened at the World's Fair.

Her most frequent acting performances were in television during the 1960s. She made two guest appearances on Perry Mason: in 1960 she played Betty Roberts in "The Case of the Singing Skirt", and in 1965 she played Jill Fenwick in "The Case of the Lover's Gamble". In 1964 O'Brien guest starred in an episode of The Man from UNCLE. Series star Robert Vaughn subsequently cast her as Ophelia in Hamlet at the Pasadena Playhouse.

After her acting career ended, O'Brien sang with the Harry James band in 1968.

Television

Films

References

External links
 

1936 births
American film actresses
American television actresses
Living people
Actresses from Cambridge, Massachusetts
People from Ontario, California
Singers from Massachusetts
American women singers
21st-century American women